Wittgenstein Tractatus is a 1992 film, made by the Hungarian filmmaker Péter Forgács. It features citations from the Tractatus and other works by Ludwig Wittgenstein.

References

External links

1992 short films
1992 films
Hungarian short films
1990s Hungarian-language films